Vladimir Alekseyevich Azarov (born 19 March 1994) is a Russian football player for Akron Tolyatti.

Club career
He made his debut in the Russian Second Division for FC Akademiya Tolyatti on 4 August 2011 in a game against FC Rubin-2 Kazan.

He made his Russian Football National League debut for FC Sibir Novosibirsk on 13 July 2013 in a game against FC Arsenal Tula.

Career statistics

Club

Honours and achievements

Club
FC Noah
 Armenian Cup (1): 2019–20

References

External links

1994 births
Sportspeople from Novosibirsk
Living people
Russian footballers
Russia youth international footballers
Association football midfielders
FC Rubin Kazan players
FC Sibir Novosibirsk players
FC Noah players
FC Akron Tolyatti players
Russian First League players
Russian Second League players
Armenian Premier League players
Russian expatriate footballers
Expatriate footballers in Armenia
Russian expatriate sportspeople in Armenia